α-Methyltryptamine (abbreviated as αMT, AMT) is a psychedelic, stimulant, and entactogen drug of the tryptamine class. It was originally developed as an antidepressant by workers at Upjohn in the 1960s, and was used briefly as an antidepressant in Russia under the trade name Indopan before being discontinued.

Chemistry 
αMT is a tryptamine with a methyl substituent at the alpha carbon. This alpha substitution makes it a relatively poor substrate for monoamine oxidase A, thereby prolonging αMT's half-life, allowing it to reach the brain and enter the central nervous system. Its chemical relation to tryptamine is analogous to that of amphetamine to phenethylamine, amphetamine being α-methylphenethylamine. αMT is closely related to the neurotransmitter serotonin (5-hydroxytryptamine) which partially explains its mechanism of action.

Synthesis
The synthesis of αMT can be accomplished through several different routes, the two most widely known being the Nitroaldol Condensation between indole-3-carboxaldehyde and nitroethane under ammonium acetate catalysis and the condensation between indole-3-acetone and hydroxylamine followed by reduction of the obtained ketoxime with lithium aluminum hydride.

Pharmacology 
αMT acts as a relatively balanced reuptake inhibitor and releasing agent of the main three monoamines; serotonin, norepinephrine, and dopamine, and as a non-selective serotonin receptor agonist.

MAOI activity
αMT has been shown as a reversible inhibitor of the enzyme monoamine oxidase (MAO) in-vitro and in-vivo.

In rats the potency of αMT as an MAO-A inhibitor in the brain was approximately equal to that of harmaline at equimolar doses. Dextroamphetamine did not enhance the 5-hydroxytryptophan-induced rise of serotonin at any level.

Metabolism

2-Oxo-αMT, 6-hydroxy-αMT, 7-hydroxy-αMT and 1′-hydroxy-αMT were detected as metabolites of αMT in male Wistar rats
.

Dosage and effects 
Under the trade name Indopan, 5-10 milligrams were used for an antidepressant effect.

With 20–30 milligrams, euphoria, empathy, and psychedelic effects become apparent and can last as long as 12 hours. A dose exceeding 40 mg is generally considered strong. In rare cases or extreme doses, the duration of effects might exceed 24 hours. Users report that αMT in freebase form is smoked, with doses between and 2 and 5 milligrams.

Neurologic side effects of αMT include agitation, restlessness, confusion, and lethargy. Physical manifestations including vomiting, mydriasis (pupillary dilation), jaw clenching, tachycardia, salivation, diaphoresis (sweating), and elevations in blood pressure, temperature, and respiratory rate.

Side effects self-reported by recreational users include anxiety, muscle tension, jaw tightness, pupil dilation, tachycardia, headaches, nausea, and vomiting,  as well as psychedelic effects including visual hallucinations and an altered state of mind.

Legality

Australia
The 5-Methoxy analogue, 5-MeO-αMT is schedule 9 in Australia and αMT would be controlled as an analogue of this.

China

As of October 2015 αMT is a controlled substance in China.

Denmark
In Denmark (2010), the Danish Minister for the Interior and Health placed αMT to their lists of controlled substances (List B).

Canada
Canada has no mention of αMT in the Controlled Drugs and Substances Act.

Germany
αMT is listed under the Narcotics Act in schedule 1 (narcotics not eligible for trade and medical prescriptions) in Germany.

Austria
αMT is placed under Austrian law (NPSG) Group 6.

Hungary
αMT was controlled on the Schedule C list in Hungary in 2013.

Slovakia
αMT was placed in 2013 on the List of Hazardous Substances in Annex, § 2 in Slovakia.

Slovenia
αMT appeared on the Decree on Classification of Illicit Drugs in Slovenia (2013).

Lithuania
In Lithuania (2012), αMT is controlled as a tryptamine derivative put under control in the 1st list of Narcotic Drugs and Psychotropic Substances which use is prohibited for medical purposes.

Spain
αMT is legal in Spain.

Sweden
Sveriges riksdags health ministry Statens folkhälsoinstitut classified αMT as "health hazard" under the act Lagen om förbud mot vissa hälsofarliga varor (translated Act on the Prohibition of Certain Goods Dangerous to Health) as of Mar 1, 2005,  in their regulation SFS 2005:26 listed as alfa-metyltryptamin (AMT), making it illegal to sell or possess.

United Kingdom
αMT was made illegal in the United Kingdom as of 7 January 2015, along with 5-MeO-DALT.
This was following the events of 10 June 2014 when the Advisory Council on the Misuse of Drugs recommended that αMT be scheduled as a class A drug by updating the blanket ban clause on tryptamines.

United States
The Drug Enforcement Administration (DEA) placed αMT temporarily in schedule I of the Controlled Substances Act (CSA) on April 4, 2003, pursuant to the temporary scheduling provisions of the CSA (68 FR16427). On September 29, 2004, αMT was permanently controlled as a schedule I substance under the CSA (69FR 58050).

Finland 
AMT, alfa-methyltryptamine is a controlled drug in Finland

Reported deaths 

αMT is capable of causing life-threatening side-effects including hyperthermia, hypertension, and tachycardia. Fatalities have been reported in association with high doses or concomitant use of other drugs. Fatalities verified with toxicology and autopsy include those of a 22 year old man in Miami-Dade county and a British teenager, both who died after consuming 1 g of αMT.

See also 

 4-Methyl-αMT
 5-Fluoro-αMT
 5-MeO-αMT
 α-Ethyltryptamine
 α,N-DMT
 α,N,N-TMT
 α-Methyl-5-HT

Notes

References

External links 
 TiHKAL entry
 αMT Entry in TiHKAL • info
 Erowid page on αMT
 Lycaeum page on αMT

Antidepressants
Entactogens and empathogens
Designer drugs
Monoamine oxidase inhibitors
Psychedelic tryptamines
Russian drugs
Serotonin-norepinephrine-dopamine releasing agents
Stimulants
Serotonin receptor agonists
Withdrawn drugs